Antonio Raul Corbo is an American child actor known for his role as Nikolaj Boyle in the series Brooklyn Nine-Nine.

Biography 
He began his acting career in Austin, Texas at the age of 5. He auditioned and made several national commercials.

In 2016, at seven years old, he began his acting career in Los Angeles obtaining his most recognized role in the series Brooklyn Nine-Nine as Nikolaj Boyle; adoptive son of Charles Boyle and Genevieve Mirren-Carter. That same year, he appeared on New Girl as the same character.

His first appearance in Brooklyn Nine-Nine was in 2016 in the chapter called "The Night Shift" belonging to the fourth season. His latest appearance in that series was in 2020, in the episode called: "Ding Dong" belonging to the seventh season.

In 2019 he voiced Capri Oliver in The Secret Life of Pets 2.

In 2020 he appeared as Sammy in the CBS series Broke.

Filmography

Series

Movies

Additional voice in series

References

External links 

Living people
American male film actors
American male child actors
American male television actors
American male voice actors
Year of birth missing (living people)